Anaganaga is an Indian Telugu-language romantic anthology series directed by Hussain Sha Kiran and produced by Geetha Golla. The series has an ensemble cast of Ram Karthik, Sameer Malla, Kiran Srinivas, Abhishek Maharshi, Maya Nelluri, Deviyani Sarma, Tarun Shetty, Pooja Kiran Ramaraju, Surya Sreenivas and Monica Tavanam. The nine-episode series was premiered on ZEE5 on 23 January 2020.

Synopsis 
The story revolves around 8 people from different walks of life who are all embroiled in love. The situation turns interesting when all these people connect with each other. How their lives turn complex with love, guilt, pain and destiny is the remaining story.

Cast

Main 

 Ram Karthik as Vamsi Acharya
 Sameer Malla as Jai 
 Kiran Srinivas as Himanshu Dev Kashyap (Voice dubbed by Hemachandra)
 Abhishek Maharshi as Kalyan
 Maya Nelluri as Anjali
 Deviyani Sarma as Tara Sharma (Voice dubbed by Chandralekha)
 Tarun Shetty as Sam
 Pooja Kiran Ramaraju as Eesha
 [[Surya Sreenivas]] as Anand (Voice dubbed by Sandeep)
 Monica Tavanam as Maya

Recurring 

 Priya Vallabhi
 Sai Charan Reddy
 Basha as Tara's father
 Revanth

Episodes

Reception 
A critic of Binged stated that "he way the director starts and ends his love stories at the same location helps the viewer see a single situation from different perspectives. Otherwise, Anaganaga has nothing much going for it." and rated it 4/10.

References

External links 

 
 Anaganaga on ZEE5

Telugu-language web series
ZEE5 original programming
2020 web series debuts
2020 web series endings
Indian romance television series
Romantic drama television series
Indian drama web series
Indian anthology television series
2020s anthology television series